Makaya McCraven (born October 19, 1983) is an American jazz drummer and bandleader.

Life and career 
McCraven was born in Paris, France, to jazz drummer  and Hungarian singer Ágnes Zsigmondi (of the band ), and from the age of three was raised in and around Amherst and Northampton, Massachusetts. At the age of five he played in his father's drum ensemble, the CMSS Bashers, along with some of his father's students. In middle school, he and friends formed a band to accompany his mother's folk singing. In high school, McCraven formed the jazz-hip hop Cold Duck Complex. He studied music at the University of Massachusetts Amherst, becoming part of the university's jazz orchestra and receiving various DownBeat student awards, but did not graduate.

In 2007 McCraven moved to Chicago, where he performed in the bands of Bobby Broom, Willie Pickens, and with the Occidental Brothers, Marquis Hill, and Jeff Parker. He also worked as a studio musician for Apollo Sunshine and Kris Delmhorst. In 2012 he released his debut album, Split Decision, through Chicago Sessions, leading a trio. In the following years he appeared weekly with other musicians, from which he developed concepts for his 2015 album, In the Moment. He also performed with Kamasi Washington. In 2016 he toured mostly in Europe. After several mix tapes, in 2018 he released the double album Universal Beings, on which he was joined by musicians from New York City, London, and Los Angeles; the album was nominated for the Jazz Journalists Association Awards in 2019. In DownBeat's 2020 Critics Poll, he was the winner in the "Rising Star" categories of best producer and best drummer of the year. In September, 2022, McCraven released In These Times, a full-length album that had been in development since 2015, through International Anthem.

McCraven is married to Nitasha Tamar Sharma, a professor of African-American and Asian-American Studies at Northwestern University as of 2018.

Discography 
 GMG (Greg Spero, Makaya McCraven, Graham Czach), 2008
 Bassprint (Marlene Rosenberg Quartet: Marlene Rosenberg, Geoff Bradfield,  & Makaya McCraven), 2012
 Split Decision, 2012
 In the Moment, 2015, International Anthem Recording Company
 In the Moment Remix Tape, 2015
 Highly Rare, 2017
 Where We Come from (Chicago X London Mixtape), 2018, International Anthem Recording Company
 Universal Beings, 2018
 Moving Cities ( & Makaya McCraven), 2019
 We're New Again: A Reimagining by Makaya McCraven (Gil Scott-Heron [posthumously] & Makaya McCraven), 2020, XL Recordings
 Universal Beings E&F Sides, 2020
 Deciphering The Message, 2020
 In These Times, 2022, Nonesuch Records, XL Recordings

References

External links 
 
 
 
 Makaya McCraven on Spotify
 

1983 births
Living people
American jazz drummers
American bandleaders
Musicians from Paris